Around Us Entertainment is a South Korean independent entertainment company established by Yoon Doo-joon, Yang Yo-seob, Yong Jun-hyung, Lee Gi-kwang, Son Dong-woon from boy group Highlight, formerly known as Beast, after leaving their former label Cube Entertainment.

History
After the BEAST members' contracts with Cube Entertainment expired, they decided to set up their own independent company for their future promotions. The name Around Us was coined "with the desire to be closer with and engage more people frequently". The label aims "to create music and content that everyone can easily enjoy anywhere around us". 
In February 2017, the former BEAST members rebranded themselves as Highlight, after deciding to cease their legal disputes over the copyright of the name BEAST with their former agency Cube Entertainment.

Artists

Groups
Highlight
The Wind

Soloists
Yang Yo-seob
Lee Gi-kwang
Son Dong-woon
Yoon Doo-joon

Songwriters
Yoon Doo-joon
Yang Yo-seob
Lee Gi-kwang
Son Dong-woon

Actors
Lee Gi-kwang
Yoon Doo-joon

Former artists
 Highlight
Yong Jun-hyung (2016–2021)

References

External links
 

South Korean independent record labels
Music companies of South Korea
2016 establishments in South Korea
Record labels established in 2016
Companies based in Seoul
Labels distributed by Kakao M